Susan Peters  (born 30 May 1980) is a multiple award-winning Nigerian actress with over 50 credits in Nollywood (Nigerian) films. She is a star on Nigerian TV, a successful model, interior designer and beauty salon owner. Recently, she won the 2011 Afro Hollywood Best Actress (English) Award for her role in Bursting Out, NAFCA Awards (Nollywood and African Film Critics Awards) North Carolina Nigerian Oscars: Best Actress in Supporting Role 2011 the BON (Best Of Nollywood) Best Supporting Actress Award 2011, and the Actress of the Year 2010 and Most Stylish Actress 2012 Awards from City People Magazine. In 2011, she made the December cover of the creatively acclaimed, arts and culture magazine, Zen.

Early life and career
Peters was born into a military family of Idoma extraction on 30 May 1980 in Ado Local Government Area, Benue State in central Nigeria. Her family moved around Nigeria extensively and, as a consequence, she speaks several Nigerian languages. Peters was sent to Airforce nursery and primary schools and FGG College in Wuse, Abuja. She went on to study Computer Science at Asman English School, graduating in 1998. Later, she studied TV and Film at Video Waves and Camera Film School and graduated in 2002. There, according to her official biography, she finished Best Overall Female in her class. She started acting in Nollywood films in 2002, the same year that she graduated.
The following year she began modelling and appeared in billboards, TV commercials, press ads and handbills for companies such as British American Tobacco (BAT), Fidelity Bank, Bank PHB, Golden Penny Pasta, UHF,   Long-life milk, Haemeron Blood Tonic and FinBank Nigeria.

Despite increasing pressure for Nollywood actresses to perform raunchy love scenes and appear with little or no clothing, Peters has stated, more than once, that she is not planning to follow suit.

Personal life
Although Susan Peters regularly speaks about her family in interviews. she is discrete about romance and has rarely been linked with any men in the popular press. She said in an interview in 2011 that she was in a relationship but didn't mention a name, stating that "It’s my private life and I like to keep my private life private. She was married to a Dutchman in 2015 but she is now divorced.

Awards

This is a selection of awards received by Susan Peters:

 City People Awards: Outstanding Performance 2010
 NAFCA Awards (Nollywood and African Film Critics Awards) North Carolina
 Nigerian Oscars: Best Actress in Supporting Role 2011
 Afro-Hollywood Awards, UK: 16th African Film Awards 2011, Best Actress English Language, for the film Bursting Out
 Best of Nollywood Awards 2011: Best Supporting Actress for Bursting Out
 DIVA Awards 2011: award of recognition to the growth of the industry
 City People Magazine Beauty and Fashion Awards 2012: Most Stylish Actress
 Golden Icons Academy Movie Awards (GIAMA) Awards 2012, Houston, USA: Best Supporting Actress

Filmography

Television series

References

External links
 Official Website

Actresses from Benue State
1980 births
Living people
Idoma people
21st-century Nigerian actresses
Nigerian film actresses
Nigerian television personalities
Nigerian female models
People from Benue State
Nigerian women in business
Nigerian businesspeople